Henry John Brinsley Manners, 8th Duke of Rutland,  (16 April 1852 – 8 May 1925), known as Henry Manners until 1888 and styled Marquess of Granby between 1888 and 1906, was a British peer and Conservative politician.

Background
Rutland was the only child of John Manners, 7th Duke of Rutland, by his first wife Catherine Louisa Georgina, daughter of Colonel George Marley. His mother died just before his second birthday. He had four half-siblings from his father's second marriage, including Lord Edward Manners and Lord Cecil Manners. He gained the courtesy title of Marquess of Granby in 1888 when his father succeeded his elder brother in the dukedom.

Career
Rutland succeeded his father as Member of Parliament for Melton in 1888, a seat he held until 1895. In 1896 he was summoned to the House of Lords through a writ of acceleration in his father's junior title of Baron Manners. In 1906 he succeeded his father as eighth Duke of Rutland. He was appointed Honorary Colonel of the 1st Volunteer Battalion of the Leicestershire Regiment in 1897. He served as Lord Lieutenant of Leicestershire from November 1900 until his death in 1925, and was also President of the North British Academy of Arts at its inauguration and for many years. In 1918 he was made a Knight of the Garter.

Family
Rutland married Violet, daughter of Colonel the Hon. Charles Lindsay, on 25 November 1882. They had five children:

Lady (Victoria) Marjorie Harriet Manners (1883–1946), married Charles Paget, 6th Marquess of Anglesey and had issue.
Robert Charles John Manners, Lord Haddon (1885–1894), died young.
John Henry Montagu Manners, 9th Duke of Rutland (1886–1940), married Kathleen Tennant and had issue.
Lady Violet Catherine Manners (1888–1971), rumoured to be fathered by Montagu Corry, 1st Baron Rowton. She married firstly, Hugo Charteris, Lord Elcho, son of Hugo Charteris, 11th Earl of Wemyss and had issue, David Charteris, 12th Earl of Wemyss. She married secondly, Guy Benson.
Lady Diana Olivia Winifred Maud Manners (1892–1986), possibly fathered by Harry Cust. She married Duff Cooper, later 1st Viscount Norwich, and had one son.

Rutland died in May 1925, aged 73, and was succeeded in the dukedom by his second and only surviving son, John. The Duchess of Rutland died in December 1937, aged 81.

References

External links

1852 births
1925 deaths
108
Knights of the Garter
Lord-Lieutenants of Leicestershire
Granby, Henry Manners, Marquess of
Granby, Henry Manners, Marquess of
Granby, Henry Manners, Marquess of
Rutland, D8
H
Presidents of the Marylebone Cricket Club
Principal Private Secretaries to the Prime Minister
British landowners